Yemen participated in the 2018 Asian Games in Jakarta and Palembang, Indonesia from 18 August to 2 September 2018. Yemen has participated seven times at the Games since 1990 Beijing, and collected 2 bronze medals this far.

Competitors 
Yemen participated in ten sporting events with a total 31 competitors. Six athletes (Abdulelah Mones, Ahmed Ayash, Ali Khousrof, Hussein Al-Jarrah, Salem Mohammed, and Zeyad Mater) competed in two sporting events. The following is a list of the number of competitors representing Yemen that participated at the Games:

Athletics 

Yemen entered five athletes (3 men's and 2 women's) to participate in the athletics competition at the Games.

Ju-jitsu 

Men

Judo 

Yemen participated in Judo at the Games with 4 athletes:

Men

Karate 

Yemen participated in the karate competition at the Games with three men's athletes.

Men

Kurash 

Men

Swimming

Men

Women

Table tennis 

Individual

Team

Taekwondo 

Kyorugi

Wrestling 

Men's freestyle

Men's Greco-Roman

Wushu 

Taolu

Sanda

Key: * TV – Technical victory.

References 

Nations at the 2018 Asian Games
2018
Asian Games